Birger Norman (30 July 1914 – 13 September 1995) was a Swedish journalist, poet, novelist, playwright and non-fiction writer.

Biography
Birger Norman was born at Svanö  in Kramfors, Sweden. He was raised in the historic province of Ångermanland.
He first worked as a journalist and chronicler with the magazine .
He made his literary debut in 1951, with the poetry collection . He received the Litterturfrämjandets stora pris in 1971 and the Dobloug Prize in 1989 as well as the Illis quorum in 1991. He died in Stockholm in 1995.  The Birger Norman Society was formed in April 2004.

References

External links
Birger Normansällskapet website

1914 births
1995 deaths
People from Ångermanland
Swedish male poets
20th-century Swedish novelists
Swedish non-fiction writers
20th-century Swedish dramatists and playwrights
Dobloug Prize winners
Swedish male novelists
Swedish male dramatists and playwrights
20th-century Swedish male writers
20th-century Swedish journalists
Male non-fiction writers
Recipients of the Illis quorum